Mount Carmel Heights is an unincorporated community located in Clermont County, Ohio, United States.

References

	

Unincorporated communities in Clermont County, Ohio
Unincorporated communities in Ohio